Golden Earring (originally known as The Tornados) was a Dutch rock band, founded in 1961 in The Hague as The Golden Earrings. They achieved worldwide fame with their international hit songs  "Radar Love" in 1973, which went to number one on the Dutch chart, reached the top ten in the United Kingdom, and went to number thirteen on the United States chart, "Twilight Zone" in 1982, and "When the Lady Smiles" in 1984. During their career they had nearly 30 top-ten singles on the Dutch charts and released 25 studio albums.

The band went through a number of early line-up changes, though the band reached a stable line-up in 1970, consisting of Rinus Gerritsen (bass and keyboards), George Kooymans (vocals and guitar), Barry Hay (vocals, guitar, flute and saxophone), and Cesar Zuiderwijk (drums and percussion), which remained unchanged until the band broke up in 2021 following the diagnosis of Kooymans with ALS. A number of other musicians also appeared in short stints with the band over its history as well.

History

Early years (1961–1969)
What became Golden Earring was formed in 1961 in The Hague by 13-year-old George Kooymans and his 15-year-old neighbor, Rinus Gerritsen. Originally called "the Tornados", the name was changed to the Golden Earrings when they discovered that the name the Tornados was already in use by another group. The name "the Golden Earrings" was taken from an instrumental called "Golden Earrings" performed by the British group the Hunters, for whom they served as opening and closing act. Initially a pop-rock band with Frans Krassenburg on lead vocals and Jaap Eggermont on drums, the Golden Earrings had a hit with their debut single "Please Go", recorded in 1965. Dissatisfied with Dutch recording studios, the band's manager and co-discoverer Fred Haayen arranged for the next single to be recorded at the Pye Records studios in London. The record cut at Pye, "That Day", reached number two on the Dutch charts. The definite article was dropped from the name in 1967, and the plural "s" was dropped in 1969.

In 1968, Barry Hay joined the band, replacing Krassenburg as frontman. Two years later, the band earned their first number one hit in the Netherlands with the song "Dong Dong Diki Digi Dong". In the United States, ground work for entering the US market was being laid by East Coast FM radio disc jockey and music critic Neil Kempfer-Stocker, who is credited as the first radio DJ to play the band in the US. This single was followed by a successful psychedelic album Eight Miles High, which featured a 19-minute version of the title track, a cover of the 1966 hit song by the Byrds. The song, played throughout their US tour, became the core performance of their live shows, and their experience in the US led them to make their studio albums resemble their live shows, rather than the other way around. The band's American records during this period were issued by the Perception Records label in New York, and the band's Golden Earring LP, known as Wall of Dolls, and single "Back Home" performed poorly in the US but became a number 1 hit in the Netherlands.

International fame (1970s and 1980s)

In 1969, drummer Cesar Zuiderwijk joined the band, completing what has become Golden Earring's classic line-up. The band enjoyed brief international fame in the 1970s when the single version of "Radar Love" (1973), from the gold-certified album Moontan became a hit in both Europe and the US. Golden Earring embarked on their first major US tour in 1969–1970. Owing to American influences, their music evolved towards hard rock, and they performed along with Jimi Hendrix, Led Zeppelin, Procol Harum, and Eric Clapton. Between 1969 and 1984, Golden Earring completed 13 US tours. During this period, they performed as the opening act for Santana, King Crimson, the Doobie Brothers, Rush and .38 Special. During 1973–74, when "Radar Love" was a hit, they had Kiss and Aerosmith as their opening acts. While signed to the UK Track Records label, the band rented the superb quadraphonic sound system normally used exclusively by the Who.
 
Golden Earring enjoyed a brief period of US stardom, but were unable to secure further chart success until 1982's "Twilight Zone". The music video of the song, directed by Dick Maas, was played on the recently launched MTV in the United States, and helped the song to become a US hit, spending 27 weeks on the Billboard chart.

"When the Lady Smiles" became an international hit in 1984, reaching No. 3 in Canada and becoming the band's fifth number one hit in their native country, but was not successful in the United States, reaching no higher than #76 on the US Singles Chart. The video was banned from MTV because of its "unholy desires about a nun and a lobotomy"; this was Dick Maas's second video for the band, and helped launch his career as a film director. While touring the US in 1984, the band played at the Great Arena Six Flags Great Adventure in New Jersey on May 11 and were in the midst of their performance when a fire broke out at the Haunted Castle on the opposite side of the theme park, killing eight teenagers. Following this tour, Golden Earring turned their focus toward Europe where they continued to attract standing-room-only crowds. The group paused briefly after the release of The Hole in 1986 to focus on other projects, with Hay and Kooymans both releasing solo albums (Victory of Bad Taste and Solo, respectively) the following year. The group then reconvened to record their final album of the 1980s, releasing Keeper of the Flame in 1989.

Later years (1990s–2021)
In 1991, Golden Earring had another hit in the Netherlands with "Going to the Run", a rock-ballad about a Hells Angels motorcycle gang member who was a friend of the band and died in a crash. The Russian rock band Aria made a successful cover of "Going to the Run" as "Беспечный ангел" ("Careless Angel"). Between 1992 and 2004, the band released three acoustic live unplugged albums, which became quick successes. The acoustic albums feature unplugged versions of famous hits of the band, and have been some of the band's best-selling albums, such as The Naked Truth, which sold over 500,000 copies in the Netherlands.

Golden Earring performed over 200 concerts a year, mainly in their home country and occasionally in Belgium, Germany, and the UK. These energetic live performances have been recorded on several live albums—Live, recorded at London's Rainbow Theater in 1977; 2nd Live, 1981; Something Heavy Going Down, 1984 (also released on DVD as Live from the Twilight Zone); and Last Blast of the Century, a live recording of their last concert of the 20th century (available on both CD and DVD). Furthermore, the band's acoustic live albums include The Naked Truth (1992), Naked II (1997) and Naked III (2005). Their latest live album, Live from Ahoy 2006, is a DVD with bonus CD.

Golden Earring celebrated their 50th anniversary in 2011, which the Dutch postal service honored with a stamp that contained a music link: when a smartphone with a special app is held up to the music stamp, Golden Earring's "Radar Love" plays.

On 11 May 2012, the band released their latest studio album, entitled Tits 'n Ass. The album was recorded in London during summer of 2011 with producer Chris Kimsey and peaked at No. 1 in the Dutch album charts twice. The album's song "Still Got the Keys to My First Cadillac" was issued as a single. A video for the song featured young impersonators of Golden Earring.

On 5 February 2021, the band's manager announced to the Dutch press that their active career was over due to George Kooymans' serious illness.

Personnel
Rinus Gerritsen – bass, keyboards, guitar, harmonica (1961–2021)
George Kooymans – guitar, vocals (1961–2021)
Barry Hay – vocals, guitar, flute, saxophone (1967–2021)
Cesar Zuiderwijk – drums, percussion (1970–2021)
Fred van der Hilst – drums, percussion (1962–1965)
Hans van Herwerden – guitar (1962–1963)
Peter de Ronde – guitar (1963–1966)
Frans Krassenburg – vocals (1964–1967)
Jaap Eggermont – drums, percussion (1965–1969)
Sieb Warner – drums, percussion (1969–1970)
Bertus Borgers – saxophone (1973–1976)
Eelco Gelling – guitar (1973–1975, 1976–1978)
Robert Jan Stips – keyboards, synthesizers (1974–1976, 1977–1978, 1980, 1982, 1986)
John Lagrand – harmonica (1979)

Lineups

Timeline

Discography

 Just Ear-rings (1965)
 Winter-Harvest (1967)
 Miracle Mirror (1968)
 On the Double (1969)
 Eight Miles High (1969)
 Golden Earring (1970)
 Seven Tears (1971)
 Together (1972)
 Moontan (1973)
 Switch (1975)
 To the Hilt (1976)
 Contraband (1976)
 Grab It for a Second (1978)
 No Promises...No Debts (1979)
 Prisoner of the Night (1980)
 Cut (1982)
 N.E.W.S. (1984)
 The Hole (1986)
 Keeper of the Flame (1989)
 Bloody Buccaneers (1991)
 Face It (1994)
 Love Sweat (1995)
 Paradise in Distress (1999)
 Millbrook U.S.A. (2003)
 Tits 'n Ass (2012)
 The Hague (EP) (2015)

References

Sources
 Biography by Golden Earring founder and bass player Rinus Gerritsen published on the band's website.
 Biographical books on the Golden Earring: Haagsche Bluf by Pieter Franssen, 1993, and Rock die niet roest by prof. Maarten Steenmeyer, 2005. Both titles are in Dutch.
 The Story of Golden Earring by Karin and Mechteld Beks, Picture publishers, an authorized biography published on the occasion of the band's 45th anniversary. Text in Dutch. (2005)
 Interviews with the band over the years, many of which can be traced back through the Golden Earring Museum website.

External links

 
 Radar Love TimeTravel
 English-language interview with George Kooymans for MusicMirror 

1961 establishments in the Netherlands
2021 disestablishments in the Netherlands
Dutch hard rock musical groups
Dutch psychedelic rock music groups
Musical groups established in 1961
Musical groups disestablished in 2021
Musical groups from The Hague